Elections to Liverpool City Council were held on Saturday 1 November 1888. One third of the council seats were up for election, the term of office of each councillor being three years.

Eight of the sixteen seats were contested.

After the election, the composition of the council was:

Election result

Ward results

* - Retiring Councillor seeking re-election

Abercromby

Castle Street

Everton

Exchange

Great George

Lime Street

North Toxteth

Pitt Street

Rodney Street

St. Anne Street

St. Paul's

St. Peter's

Scotland

South Toxteth

Vauxhall

West Derby

By-elections

No. 9 Great George, 14 May 1889

Caused by the resignation of Councillor Thomas Bird Hall (Conservative, 
Great George, elected 1 November 1886)
 reported to the Council on 1 May 1889
.

No. 12, Lime Street, 8 August 1889

Caused by the death of Councillor Sir James Allanson Picton (Liberal, Lime Street, elected 1 November 1888)

on 15 July 1889
.

.

No. 2, Scotland

Caused by the death of Councillor Patrick Edmund O'Hare (Irish Home Rule, Scotland, elected 29 December 1887) 
on 3 October 1889
.

Councillor O'Hare's term of office was due to expire on 1 November 1889.

See also

 Liverpool City Council
 Liverpool Town Council elections 1835 - 1879
 Liverpool City Council elections 1880–present
 Mayors and Lord Mayors of Liverpool 1207 to present
 History of local government in England

References

1888
1888 English local elections
November 1888 events
1880s in Liverpool